Yap Sports Complex is located in Abay, Gagil, Yap State, Federated States of Micronesia. It is the national stadium and the home of Yap sporting events. The stadium's capacity is around 2,000, and it was built in 2001—in time for the 3rd FSM Games. In 2018, it was renovated and extended in time for the 9th Micronesian Games hosted by Yap State for the very first time. Association football club Nimgil, champions of Micronesia after defeating Weloy in 2021, use the venue for games.

References

Sports venues completed in 2001
Football venues in Micronesia
Athletics (track and field) venues in the Federated States of Micronesia